Antonio Cañizares Llovera (born 15 October 1945) is a Spanish cardinal of the Roman Catholic Church who was the Archbishop of Valencia from 2014 to 2022. He was prefect of the Congregation for Divine Worship and the Discipline of the Sacraments from 2008 to 2014, and archbishop of Toledo and Primate of Spain from 2002 to 2008. He was made a cardinal in 2006.

Early life
Antonio Cañizares was born in Utiel, and studied at the minor and major seminaries in Valencia and at the Pontifical University of Salamanca, from where he obtained his doctorate in theology, specializing in catechesis. He was ordained to the priesthood by Archbishop José García Lahiguera on 21 June 1970, and then served as assistant pastor and delegate for catechesis in the Archdiocese of Valencia.

Following his transfer to the Archdiocese of Madrid, Cañizares taught catechetical theology at the University of Salamanca and fundamental theology at the Conciliar Seminary of Madrid. He later became the director and a professor of the Institute of Religious Science and Catechesis in Madrid, and sat on several commissions and secretariats of the Spanish Episcopal Conference as well. From 1985 to 1992, Cañizares served as director of the Secretariat of the Episcopal Commission for the Doctrine of the Faith. He also founded and was the first president of Asociación Española de Catequistas, and was Director of the review Teología y Catequesis.

Episcopal career

On 6 March 1992, Cañizares was appointed as Bishop of Ávila by Pope John Paul II. He received his episcopal consecration on the following 25 April from Archbishop Mario Tagliaferri, with Cardinals Ángel Suquía Goicoechea and Marcelo González Martín serving as co-consecrators, in the Cathedral of Ávila. Cañizares Llovera later became a member of the Congregation for the Doctrine of the Faith in the Roman Curia on 10 November 1996, and was named Archbishop of Granada on 10 December of that same year. In addition to his duties in Granada, he was Apostolic Administrator of Cartagena from January to October 1998, and was elected President of the Episcopal Commission of Education and Catechesis in 1999.

Cañizares Llovera was promoted to Archbishop of Toledo and Primate of Spain on 24 October 2002 by Pope John Paul II. He was elected vice-president of the Spanish Episcopal Conference as well. Pope Benedict XVI created him Cardinal-Priest of San Pancrazio in the consistory of 24 March 2006. He was awarded an honorary doctorate by the Universidad CEU Cardenal Herrera on that same date.

Prefect of the Congregation for Divine Worship and the Discipline of the Sacraments
On 9 December 2008, Pope Benedict appointed him Prefect of the Congregation for Divine Worship and the Discipline of the Sacraments.

On 4 March 2010, he was appointed a member of the Pontifical Committee for International Eucharistic Congresses. He is also a member of the Congregation for the Doctrine of the Faith and the Congregation for Bishops as well as the Pontifical Commission Ecclesia Dei. On 5 March he was appointed a member of the Congregation for the Evangelization of Peoples.

Cañizares was elected to medalla nº 16 of the Real Academia de la Historia on 1 December 2006 and he took up his seat on 24 February 2008. Cañizares is sometimes known by his nickname of "Little Ratzinger," referring to the similar beliefs and opinions between him and Benedict XVI, born Joseph Ratzinger, who himself is aware of and "very amused by this expression."

In 2013 it was reported that the Congregation is preparing a booklet to help priests celebrate the Mass properly and the faithful to participate better. Cardinal Canizares Llovera confirmed this at an address at the Spanish Embassy to the Holy See on "Catholic Liturgy since Vatican II: Continuity and Evolution." "We are preparing it; it will help to celebrate well and to participate well.  During his talk the cardinal reiterated the importance Vatican II gave to the liturgy, "whose renewal must be understood in continuity with the Tradition of the Church and not as a break or discontinuity." A break either because of innovations that do not respect continuity or because of an immobility that freezes everything at Pius XII, he said.

He was one of the cardinal electors who participated in the 2013 papal conclave that selected Pope Francis.

Archbishop of Valencia
On 28 August 2014, Pope Francis appointed Cañizares Archbishop of Valencia. He was installed on 4 October.

Pope Francis accepted his resignation as archbishop of Valencia on 10 October 2022.

Views

On receiving Holy Communion
In an interview in December 2008 Cañizares Llovera discussed the best way to receive the Eucharist: "What does it mean to receive communion in the mouth? What does it mean to kneel before the Most Holy Sacrament? What does it mean to kneel during the consecration at Mass? It means adoration, it means recognizing the real presence of Jesus Christ in the Eucharist; it means respect and an attitude of faith of a man who prostrates before God because he knows that everything comes from Him, and we feel speechless, dumbfounded, before the wondrousness, his goodness, and his mercy. That is why it is not the same to place the hand, and to receive communion in any fashion, than doing it in a respectful way; it is not the same to receive communion kneeling or standing up, because all these signs indicate a profound meaning."

In August 2010, he said that, due to the impact of earlier cultural impact and formation in children who learn at an earlier age, who are faced with mature issues earlier, and who are enormously influenced by modern morality, ethical systems, and the mass communications media, it might be preferable to start preparations for receiving the Sacraments of Penance and the Eucharist at an earlier age, which could also lead to lowering the age of reception for those sacraments (which is now about 7 or 8, the age of reason, where young children begin to be held responsible for their actions and belief systems).

On Summorum Pontificum and Tridentine Mass
In regard to the motu proprio Summorum Pontificum, Cañizares Llovera said that "[The] intention of the Pope has not only been to satisfy the followers of Monsignor Lefevbre, nor to confine himself to respond to the just wishes of the faithful who feel attached...to the liturgical heritage represented by the Roman Rite, but also, and in a special way, to open the liturgical richness of the Church to all the faithful, thus making possible the discovery of the treasures of the liturgical patrimony of the Church to those who still do not know it... even if there were not a single 'traditionalist' whom to satisfy, this 'discovery' would have been enough to justify the provisions of the Pope."

Abortion and child abuse
Speaking in the context of an abortion debate prompted by a Spanish government proposal, he said child abuse on the part of Catholic priests "cannot be compared with the millions of lives that have been destroyed by abortion. It has legally destroyed 40 million human lives."

References

External links

 
Catholic-Hierarchy
Cardinals of the Holy Roman Church

|-

|-

|-

|-

|-

1945 births
Living people
People from Requena-Utiel
21st-century Spanish cardinals
20th-century Roman Catholic archbishops in Spain
21st-century Roman Catholic archbishops in Spain
Archbishops of Toledo
Roman Catholic primates
Pontifical University of Salamanca alumni
Members of the Congregation for Bishops
Members of the Congregation for the Doctrine of the Faith
Members of the Congregation for Divine Worship and the Discipline of the Sacraments
Members of the Congregation for the Evangelization of Peoples
Members of the Real Academia de la Historia
Cardinals created by Pope Benedict XVI
Archbishops of Granada